Chester Lovelle Talton (born September 22, 1941) was the Provisional Bishop of the Episcopal Diocese of San Joaquin in the Episcopal Church.

Personal life
Born in El Dorado, Arkansas, Talton was ordained to the priesthood in February 1971, in the San Francisco-based Diocese of California. He married Karen Louise Warren in August 1963 and has four children from this union. Karen Talton died in 2003. Talton remarried in 2007, to April Grayson, a lay leader in the Diocese of Los Angeles. He is African American, and one of 37 black bishops who have been consecrated by the Episcopal Church.

Education
Talton studied at California State University, Hayward, California where he earned his B.S. in 1965, and Church Divinity School of the Pacific, Berkeley, California, where he earned his M.Div. in 1970, and ultimately his D.D.

Positions held

Positions held include Provisional Bishop, Diocese of San Joaquin, 2011 - 2014; Bishop Suffragan, Diocese of Los Angeles, 1991 to 2010; Rector, St. Philip's Church, New York City (Harlem), 1985–1990; Mission Officer, Trinity Church Wall Street, New York City, 1981–1985; Rector, St. Philip's Church, Saint Paul, Minnesota, 1976–1981; Vicar, Holy Cross Church, Chicago, Illinois, 1973–1976; Vicar, St. Mathias' Mission, and Curate, All Saints' Church, Carmel, California, 1971–1973; and Vicar, Good Shepherd Church, Berkeley, California, 1970–1971.

Talton's consecrators were Edmond L. Browning, Orris George Walker, and Robert Marshall Anderson.

Bibliography
Race and prayer: collected voices, many dreams / Malcolm Boyd and Chester L. Talton, editors. Harrisburg, Pa.: Morehouse Pub., c. 2003. xii, 202 p. : ill. ; 23 cm.  (pbk.)

External links
Office of Black Ministries: Chester Lovelle Talton
Episcopal Diocese of Los Angeles: Bishops' Offices

References

Living people
1941 births
African-American Christian clergy
African-American Episcopalians
People from El Dorado, Arkansas
California State University, East Bay alumni
Church Divinity School of the Pacific alumni
Episcopal bishops of Los Angeles
Episcopal bishops of San Joaquin
21st-century African-American people
20th-century African-American people